A list of films produced by the Israeli film industry in 1979.

1979 releases

See also
1979 in Israel

References

External links
 Israeli films of 1979 at the Internet Movie Database

Israeli
Film
1979